French Kiss: Stephen Harper's Blind Date with Quebec is a non-fiction book written by Chantal Hébert, a Canadian writer and columnist for the Toronto Star and Le Devoir, first published by Knopf Canada in April 2007. In the book, the author recounts the 2006 general election in the province of Quebec and the surprisingly strong performance of the Conservative Party in that region. Hébert describes the outcome as a "combination of Harper's tactical brilliance and Paul Martin's political ineptitude." The book presents complex issues in "clear and concise" prose. Hébert's enduring quality throughout the telling is objectivity, an increasingly rare trait amongst journalists.

Awards and honours
French Kiss received shortlist recognition for the 2008 Edna Staebler Award for Creative Non-Fiction.

References

External links
Chantal Hébert

Canadian non-fiction books
2007 non-fiction books
Stephen Harper
2006 Canadian federal election
Non-fiction books about elections
Politics of Quebec
Knopf Canada books